Charles Speed Garner (September 20, 1906 – March 10, 1966) was an American sailor. He competed in the mixed 6 metres at the 1936 Summer Olympics.

References

External links
 
 

1906 births
1966 deaths
Olympic sailors of the United States
Sailors at the 1936 Summer Olympics – 6 Metre
Sportspeople from San Bernardino, California
American male sailors (sport)